Guy Ricard (born 2 August 1942 in Saint-Côme, Quebec) was a Progressive Conservative member of the House of Commons of Canada. He was an engineer by career.

He represented the Quebec riding of Laval where he was first elected in the 1984 federal election and re-elected in 1988, therefore becoming a member in the 33rd and 34th Canadian Parliaments.

After the riding was renamed Laval West, Ricard was defeated in the 1993 federal election by Michel Dupuy of the Liberals.

Electoral record (incomplete)

External links
 

1942 births
Living people
Members of the House of Commons of Canada from Quebec
Progressive Conservative Party of Canada MPs